King Xiang of Zhou (died 619BC), personal name Ji Zheng, was the eighteenth king of the Chinese Zhou dynasty and the sixth of the Eastern Zhou. He was a successor of his father King Hui of Zhou.

He married Lady of the Dí, but later dismissed her.

In 635 he was driven from the capital by his brother Dai and was restored by Duke Wen of Jin.

After his death, his son King Qing of Zhou succeeded him.

Family
Spouse:
 Zhai Hou, of the Kui clan of Di, deposed

Sons:
 Prince Renchen (d. 613 BC), ruled as King Qing of Zhou from 618 to 613 BC
 Youngest son, the father of Prince Man, who rebuffed King Zhuang of Chu regarding the weight of the Nine Tripod Cauldrons

Ancestry

See also

Family tree of ancient Chinese emperors

References 

619 BC deaths
Zhou dynasty kings
7th-century BC Chinese monarchs
Year of birth unknown